In mathematics and the field of number theory, the Landau–Ramanujan constant is the positive real number b that occurs in a theorem proved by Edmund Landau in 1908, stating that for large , the number of positive integers below  that are the sum of two square numbers behaves asymptotically as

This constant b was rediscovered in 1913 by Srinivasa Ramanujan, in the first letter he wrote to G.H. Hardy.

Sums of two squares
By the sum of two squares theorem, the numbers that can be expressed as a sum of two squares of integers are the ones for which each prime number congruent to 3 mod 4 appears with an even exponent in their prime factorization. For instance, 45 = 9 + 36 is a sum of two squares; in its prime factorization, 32 × 5, the prime 3 appears with an even exponent, and the prime 5 is congruent to 1 mod 4, so its exponent can be odd.

Landau's theorem states that if  is the number of positive integers less than  that are the sum of two squares, then
 ,
where  is the Landau–Ramanujan constant.

History
This constant was stated by Landau in the limit form above; Ramanujan instead approximated  as an integral, with the same constant of proportionality, and with a slowly growing error term.

References

Additive number theory
Analytic number theory
Mathematical constants
Srinivasa Ramanujan